Yamaçköy can refer to:

 Yamaçköy, Bismil
 Yamaçköy, Güroymak